Katiéna is a village and rural commune in the Cercle of Ségou in the Ségou Region of southern-central Mali. The commune includes 27 villages in an area of approximately 998 square kilometers. In the 2009 census it had a population of 33,180. The Bani River runs along the southern boundary of the commune. The village of Katiéna is the (chef-lieu) of the commune.

References

External links
.
.

Communes of Ségou Region